Cameron Aaron Lawrence (born January 20, 1991) is a former American football linebacker in the National Football League for the Dallas Cowboys. He played college football at Mississippi State University.

Early years
Lawrence attended Magnolia Heights High School where he was a two-way player (quarterback & linebacker). As a senior, he was selected to the All-state second-team at linebacker and to the Mississippi Association of Private Schools All-star team. He also lettered  in track and baseball.

College career
He began his college career at Mississippi State University as an undersized player without a clear position, receiving a chance to start at middle linebacker until his junior year, when he led the team with 123 tackles (second in the SEC) and was selected to the Rivals.com All-SEC second-team. 

As a senior, he registered 111 tackles (third in the SEC), becoming the first MSU player since 1994 with 100-plus tackles in back-to-back seasons.

Professional career
Lawrence was signed by the Dallas Cowboys as an undrafted free agent after the 2013 NFL draft. On September 1, he was signed to the practice squad. After releasing safety Will Allen, the team promoted him to the active roster on October 11, in order to play special teams against the Washington Redskins. He finished tied for second on the team with 12 special teams tackles after only playing in 11 games. Injuries in the linebacker corps, forced him to play defensive snaps as a backup weakside linebacker during the last 3 games of the season.

In 2014, he registered 4 special teams tackles (tied for ninth on the team), 11 defensive tackles and a sack. He was waived injured on July 28, 2015.

Personal life
He married Shelby Farmer in April 2016. His brother Addison, signed as an undrafted free agent with the Baltimore Ravens in 2012.

References

External links
Mississippi State bio

1991 births
Living people
People from Coldwater, Mississippi
Players of American football from Mississippi
American football linebackers
Mississippi State Bulldogs football players
Dallas Cowboys players